Bhutan is among the one hundred countries that have submitted films for consideration for the Academy Award for Best International Feature Film, making their first submission in 1999. The Foreign Language Film award is handed out annually by the United States Academy of Motion Picture Arts and Sciences to a feature-length motion picture produced outside the United States that contains primarily non-English dialogue. , two Bhutanese films have been submitted for the Academy Award for Best Foreign Language Film.

Submissions
The Academy of Motion Picture Arts and Sciences has invited the film industries of various countries to submit their best film for the Academy Award for Best Foreign Language Film since 1956. The Foreign Language Film Award Committee oversees the process and reviews all the submitted films. Following this, they vote via secret ballot to determine the five nominees for the award. Below is a list of the films that Bhutan has submitted for review by the Academy for the award by year and the respective Academy Awards ceremony.

The Cup was filmed in Dolpali language, which is very similar to Tibetan.

See also
List of Academy Award winners and nominees for Best International Feature Film
List of Academy Award-winning foreign language films

Notes

References

External links
The Official Academy Awards Database
The Motion Picture Credits Database
IMDb Academy Awards Page

Bhutan
Academy Award
Academy Award